The Daugava is a river in Russia, Belarus and Latvia.

Daugava may also  refer to:

Places
Daugava River, or Western Dvina, river rising in the Valdai Hills, Russia, flowing through Russia, Belarus, and Latvia, draining into the Gulf of Riga in Latvia
Daugava 1 Hydro Power Plant, or Daugavpils hydroelectric power station, a proposed plant in Daugavpils, Latvia

Sport

Football clubs
FC Daugava Riga, a Soviet football club from Riga
FC Pardaugava Riga, a Soviet and Latvian football club
Torpedo Riga, known as Daugava
FK Daugava 90, full name FK Rīgas Futbola skola, youth football club in Riga, Latvia in the Latvian First League
FK Daugava Daugavpils, also known as FC Daugava, Latvian football club in the Latvian Higher League
FK Daugava (2003), Riga, Latvian football club in the Latvian Higher League

Stadiums
Daugava Stadium (Daugavpils), football stadium in Daugavpils, Latvia
Daugava Stadium (Liepāja), multifunctional stadium in Liepāja, Latvia
Daugava Stadium (Riga), multifunctional stadium in Riga, Latvia

Others
Daugava (album), 2007 album by Swedish singer Lars Winnerbäck
Daugava radar, or Daryal radar, Soviet bistatic phased-array early warning radar